Sir Michael Hicks Hicks-Beach, 8th Baronet  DL (25 October 1809 – 22 November 1854) was a British Conservative Party MP and High Sheriff.

He was appointed High Sheriff of Gloucestershire for 1840 and then returned as Member of Parliament (MP) for East Gloucestershire from January 1854 until his death in November of the same year.

He was commissioned as Lieutenant-Colonel of the Royal North Gloucestershire Militia in 1844 and commanded it as Lt-Col Commandant from 1852 until his death.

Hicks-Beach married Harriett Vittoria Stratton, daughter of John Stratton, in 1832.

He died in November 1854, aged 45, and was succeeded in the baronetcy by his eldest son Michael, who became a prominent Conservative politician and was created Earl St Aldwyn in 1915. Hicks-Beach's younger son William Frederick Hicks-Beach was also an MP, as was his son-in-law Sir John Dillwyn-Llewelyn, 1st Baronet, husband of his daughter Caroline Julia Hicks-Beach.

Lady Hicks-Beach died at Penllergaer, the residence of her Dillwyn-Llewelyn son-in-law, on 20 January 1900.

Notes

References 

Maj Wilfred Joseph Cripps (revised by Capt Hon M.H. Hicks-Beach & Maj B.N. Spraggett), The Royal North Gloucester Militia, 2nd Edn, Cirencester: Wilts & Gloucestershire Standard Printing Works, 1914.
Kidd, Charles, Williamson, David (editors). Debrett's Peerage and Baronetage (1990 edition). New York: St Martin's Press, 1990,

External links 
 

1809 births
1854 deaths
High Sheriffs of Gloucestershire
Gloucestershire Militia officers
Baronets in the Baronetage of England
Conservative Party (UK) MPs for English constituencies
UK MPs 1852–1857
Michael Hicks-Beach, 8th Baronet
Deputy Lieutenants of Worcestershire